A list of films produced by the Bollywood film industry based in Mumbai in 1941:

Highest-grossing films
According to Box Office India, these were the five highest-grossing films at the Indian box office in 1941:

A-B

C-D

E-K

L-M

N-R

S-Z

References

External links
 Bollywood films of 1941 at the Internet Movie Database
Listen to songs from Bollywood films of 1941

1941
Bollywood
Films, Bollywood